Cux1 (CUTL1, CDP, CDP/Cux) is a homeodomain protein that in humans is encoded by the CUX1 gene.

Function 

The protein encoded by this gene is a member of the homeodomain family of DNA binding proteins. It regulates gene expression, morphogenesis, and differentiation and it also plays a role in cell cycle progression, particularly at S-phase. Several alternatively spliced transcript variants of this gene have been described, but the full-length nature of some of these variants has not been determined, and the p200 isoform of Cux1 is processed proteolytically to  smaller active isoforms, such as p110. Cux1 DNA binding is stimulated by activation of the PAR2/F2RL1 cell-surface G-protein-coupled receptor in fibroblasts and breast-cancer epithelial cells to regulate Matrix metalloproteinase 10, Interleukin1-alpha, and Cyclo-oxygenase 2 (COX2) genes.

Role in tumor growth 

Genetic data from over 7,600 cancer patients shows that over 1% has the deactivated CUX1 which links to progression of tumor growth.  Researchers from the Wellcome Trust Sanger Institute reported that the mutation of CUX1 reduces the inhibitory effects of a biological inhibitor, PIK3IP1 (phosphoinositide-3-kinase interacting protein 1), resulted in higher activity of the growth promoting enzyme, phosphoinositide 3-kinase (PI3K) which leads to tumor progression.  Although CUX1 is mutated at a lower rate compared to other known gene mutations that cause cancer, this deactivated gene is found across many cancer types in this study to be the underlying cause of the disease.

CASP 

Tne CUX1 gene Alternatively Spliced Product was first reported in 1997. The CUX1 gene has up to 33 exons. CASP mRNA includes exons 1 through 14 and 25 through 33. The human CASP protein is predicted to contain 678 amino acids, of which 400 are shared with CUTL1. CASP protein is approximately 80 kD. It lacks the DNA binding region of CUTL1, but instead contains a trans-membrane domain that allows it to insert into lipid bilayers. It has been localized to the Golgi apparatus.

CASP has been reported to be part of a complex with Golgin 84 that tethers COPI vesicles and is important for retrograde transport in the Golgi and between the Golgi and endoplasmic reticulum. The targeting of vesicles involves tethers and SNAREs.

Interactions 

Cux1 (CUTL1, CDP, CDP/Cux) has been shown to interact with:
 CREB binding protein, 
 Retinoblastoma protein, and
 SATB1

These physical interactions are reported in BioPlex 2.0

MAGEA10
EXT2
RAB30
HLA-DQA1
STX6
WDR83
SLC39A4
LAMP1
POTEB
SLC39A12

Notes

References

Further reading

External links 
 
 

Transcription factors